Yakup Taş (16 June 1959 – 7 February 2023) was a Turkish politician from the Justice and Development Party who was a member of the Grand National Assembly of Turkey from 2018 until his death. He represented the electorate of Adıyaman. 

Taş was killed in the 2023 Turkey–Syria earthquake.

Personal life
Taş was born in Uzunköy. He was married and had 6 children.

References

See also 
 27th Parliament of Turkey

1959 births
2023 deaths
Victims of the 2023 Turkey–Syria earthquakes
Members of the 27th Parliament of Turkey
Justice and Development Party (Turkey) politicians
People from Adıyaman Province
21st-century Turkish politicians